Crowd Control is an American reality documentary television series on National Geographic Channel that premiered on November 24, 2014. The series, hosted by Daniel Pink, sets up a series of practical experiments in an attempt to change social behaviour.

Episodes

References

External links 

 
 

2010s American reality television series
2014 American television series debuts
English-language television shows
National Geographic (American TV channel) original programming
2014 American television series endings
Television series by Endemol